Cochranella mache, also known as the Mache glassfrog or Mache Cochran frog, is a species of frogs in the family Centrolenidae. It is found in the lowland forest and eastern slopes of Cordillera Mache–Chindul in the Esmeraldas Province, northwestern Ecuador, and in the western foothills of the Cordillera Occidental in Colombia (Antioquia, Chocó, and Valle del Cauca Departments).

Description
Adult males measure  and females  in snout–vent length. The dorsum is green with numerous, small yellow dots. The upper lip has a narrow white line. The ventral surfaces of the extremities as well as the gular region are greenish blue. The iris is white and has fine black reticulations and a golden ring around the pupil.

Reproduction
The call consists of two pulses lasting about 0.04 seconds and about 0.01 second apart, and with the dominant frequency of 5410 Hz. The amplexus is axillar. Fecundity of a 33 mm long female is about 30 eggs.

Habitat and conservation
The Ecuadorian population is under significant pressure from logging.

References

mache
Frogs of South America
Amphibians of Colombia
Amphibians of Ecuador
Amphibians described in 2004
Taxonomy articles created by Polbot